Cloverleaf is a neighborhood in southwest Louisville, Kentucky.  Its boundaries are I-264 to the north, Manslick Road to the east, Gagel Avenue to the south, and the Illinois Central railroad tracks to the west.  It takes its name from Cloverleaf Acres, a development in the area.  It is residential, and was annexed by Louisville in 1958.

References

External links
Map of Cloverleaf
   Images of Cloverleaf (Louisville, Ky.) in the University of Louisville Libraries Digital Collections

Neighborhoods in Louisville, Kentucky